"Feel the Beat" is a song by Finnish DJ and record producer Darude. It was released as the second single from his debut studio album Before the Storm. It shares many similar musical elements to the first single, "Sandstorm", and achieved success throughout Europe, Oceania, and America. It topped the singles charts in Finland and was a top ten hit in the UK, Ireland, Canada, and on the US (Billboard Hot Dance Club Play).

Music video
A music video was filmed for "Feel the Beat". In the video, Darude appears holding a briefcase and riding a Razor scooter. He gets into a Dodge Viper with a young woman and drives through the countryside, eventually stopping to meet a helicopter. The helicopter flies them to a dance party. Darude opens the briefcase to reveal a golden LP labeled "DARUDE – FEEL THE BEAT", which he proceeds to play on a turntable.

Track listings
These are the formats and track listings of major single releases of "Feel the Beat".

 CD maxi – Europe
 "Feel the Beat" (Radio Version) — 4:18
 "Feel the Beat" (Original Version) — 8:36
 "Feel the Beat" (JS16 Dark Mix) — 7:06
 "Feel the Beat" (Soundfreak Remix) — 5:35
 "Feel the Beat" (Missing Link Remix) — 4:54

 CD maxi – Asia
 "Feel the Beat" (Radio Edit) — 3:18
 "Feel the Beat" (Original Mix) — 8:36
 "Feel the Beat" (JS16 Dark Remix) — 7:19
 "Feel the Beat" (Rocco & Heist Remix 1) — 7:19
 "Feel the Beat" (Rocco & Heist Remix 2) — 8:50

 12" maxi – Europe
 "Feel the Beat" (original mix) — 8:36
 "Feel the Beat" (JS16 dark mix) — 7:06

 12" maxi – UK
 "Feel the Beat" (Original Mix) — 8:36
 "Feel the Beat" (JS16 Dark Mix) — 7:06
 "Feel the Beat" (Rocco & Heist Remix 1) — 7:19

 12" maxi – America
 "Feel the Beat" (Original Club Mix) — 8:36
 "Feel the Beat" (Missing Link Remix) — 4:54
 "Feel the Beat" (JS16 Dark Mix) — 7:06
 "Feel the Beat" (Soundfreak Remix) — 5:35

 CD single
 "Feel the Beat" (Edit) — 4:18
 "Feel the Beat" (Original Mix) — 8:36
 "Feel the Beat" (JS16 Dark Mix) — 7:06

 Cassette
 "Feel the Beat" (Radio Edit) — 4:18
 "Feel the Beat" (Radio Edit) — 4:18

Charts

Year-end charts

Certification

See also
List of number-one singles (Finland)

References

2000 singles
2000 songs
2001 singles
Darude songs
Number-one singles in Finland
UK Independent Singles Chart number-one singles